Casa Domaine is a residential complex of two towers, located at Tanah Abang in Jakarta, Indonesia. Casa Domaine Tower 1 is 230 meters tall, has 61 floor above the ground and 3 floor below the ground. Casa Domaine Tower 2 is 210 meters tall, has 57 floor above and 3 floor below the ground. Both the towers topped off in March, 2017. Casa Domaine Tower 1 is currently the 2nd tallest residential building in Jakarta

Land area of the complex is about 1.2 hectares complex. Adjacent to Shangri-La Hotel and Shangri-La Residences, Casa Domaine has a retail podium and facilities such as health club, Sky Terrace, swimming pool, yoga pavilion, and jogging path.

See also
List of tallest buildings in Indonesia
List of tallest buildings in Jakarta

References

Towers in Indonesia
Buildings and structures in Jakarta
Residential skyscrapers in Indonesia
Central Jakarta